Pavlos Melas (Pávlos Melás; March 29, 1870 – October 13, 1904) was a Greek revolutionary and artillery officer of the Hellenic Army. He participated in the Greco-Turkish War of 1897 and was amongst the first army officers to join the Greek Struggle for Macedonia.

Early life and career
Melas was born in Marseilles, France, the son of Michail Melas who was elected MP for Attica and mayor of Athens and brother of Vassileios Melas who was also an officer of the Hellenic Army. The Melas family was of Greek haute bourgeois descent. Pavlos' father was a wealthy merchant from Epirus. At an early age Pavlos moved to Athens to study, and later joined the Army, graduating from the Hellenic Military Academy as an artillery lieutenant in 1891. In 1892, he married Natalia Dragoumi, the daughter of Kastorian politician Stephanos Dragoumis and sister of Ion Dragoumis. In 1895, the couple had a son named Michael and a daughter, Zoe.

He became member 25 of the Ethniki Etaireia and participated in the Greco-Turkish War of 1897.

Armed action
Melas, with the cooperation of his brother-in-law Ion Dragoumis, the consul of Greece in the then Ottoman occupied Monastir (now Bitola), Kottas Christou, and Germanos Karavangelis, metropolitan bishop of Kastoria, tried to raise money for the economic support of Greek efforts in Macedonia. After the Ilinden-Preobrazhenie uprising, he decided to enter Macedonia in June 1904, to assess the situation and to see if there is any possibility of establishing a military unit to fight the Bulgarian Komitadjis (Internal Macedonian Revolutionary Organization, IMRO) and the Ottoman Turks.

Death
In July 1904 (under the alias "Captain Mikis Zezas", Καπετάν Μίκης Ζέζας), he reentered Macedonia with a small unit of men and fought against the VMRO until October 13, 1904 when he was killed after being surrounded by Ottoman forces in the village of Siatista. The village with coordinates 40° 42' N 021° 16' E has been renamed Melas in his honour, after joining Greece.

After his death, Greek efforts became more intense, resulting in the interception of Bulgarian Komitadji efforts, especially in West and Central Macedonia, which was annexed by Greece after the Balkan Wars.

Legacy
He is considered to be a symbol of the Greek Struggle for Macedonia and many of his personal belongings can be seen in the Museum of the Macedonian Struggle in Thessaloniki and Pavlos Melas Museum in Kastoria.

His granddaughter Natalia Mela was a distinguished sculptor.

Gallery

References

External links

Museum of the Macedonian Struggle, Thessaloniki
Pavlos Melas Museum, Kastoria
Photographs from the website of the Hellenic army academy including one of Melas with his family

1870 births
1904 deaths
19th-century Greek military personnel
Eastern Orthodox Christians from Greece
Eastern Orthodox Christians from France
Military personnel from Athens
Greek military personnel of the Macedonian Struggle
Hellenic Army officers
Greek military personnel killed in action
Greek nationalists
Dragoumis family
French people of Greek descent